Johan Arath Gómez (born July 23, 2001) is an American professional soccer player who plays as an attacking midfielder for 3. Liga side FSV Zwickau.

Personal life
Gómez is of Mexican descent. He is the older brother of Jonathan Gómez who plays for Real Sociedad B in the Segunda División. He began his soccer career at the age of 7, joining local Dallas club Solar. At the age of 12, Gomez moved on to the FC Dallas Academy, where he played until he turned 18, racking up over 200 goals throughout his FC Dallas youth career.

Career statistics

Club

References

External links
 
 Johan Gomez at U.S. Soccer
 Johan Gomez at U.S. Soccer Development Academy

2001 births
Living people
American soccer players
United States men's youth international soccer players
Association football forwards
FC Dallas players
North Texas SC players
Sportspeople from Arlington, Texas
Soccer players from Texas
USL League One players
American sportspeople of Mexican descent
FC Porto B players
American expatriate sportspeople in Portugal
Expatriate footballers in Portugal
American expatriate soccer players
FSV Zwickau players
3. Liga players
American expatriate soccer players in Germany